Mudiyanaya Puthran is a 1961 Indian Malayalam-language film, directed by Ramu Kariat. It stars Sathyan, Ambika Sukumaran, Kottayam Chellappan, P. J. Antony, J. A. R. Anand, Miss Kumari, Adoor Bhavani, Kedamangalam Ali, P. A. Thomas, Kambisseri Karunakaran, Thoppil Krishna Pillai and Adoor Bhasi.

The film was an adaptation of the popular stage play written by Thoppil Bhasi in 1957. The film was shot at Vijaya and Vauhini Studios. It is one of the best social movies in Malayalam, which told boldly the real life struggles of workers, projected social evils like untouchability etc. It won the National Film Award for Best Feature Film in Malayalam.

Cast 

Sathyan
Miss Kumari
Ambika Sukumaran
Adoor Bhasi
P. J. Antony
P. A. Thomas
Adoor Bhavani
J. A. R. Anand
Kambissery Karunakaran
Kedamangalam Ali
Kottayam Chellappan
Thoppil Krishna Pillai

Production 
Mudiyanaya Puthran is based on the Kerala People's Arts Club's play of the same name.

Soundtrack

Awards 
National Film Awards
 1961: President's Silver Medal for Best Feature Film in Malayalam

References

External links 
 
http://www.malayalachalachithram.com/movie.php?i=83

1961 films
1960s Malayalam-language films
Indian films based on plays
Films with screenplays by Thoppil Bhasi
Films about social issues in India
Best Malayalam Feature Film National Film Award winners
Films directed by Ramu Kariat